William Brereton may refer to:

 William Brereton (fl. 1406–1432), MP for Midhurst and Chichester
 William Brereton (courtier) (d. 1536) in the privy chamber of Henry VIII
 William Brereton (lord justice) (d. 1541), lord justice of Ireland
 Sir William Brereton (died 1559) (c. 1520–1559), MP for Cheshire in 1547 and 1559
 Sir William Brereton, 1st Baronet (1604–1661), Parliamentary General in the English Civil War
 William Brereton, 1st, 2nd and 3rd Lords Brereton
 William Brereton, 1st Baron Brereton (1550–1630), MP for Cheshire in 1597, 1614 and 1621
 William Brereton, 2nd Baron Brereton (1611–1664), MP for Cheshire in 1661
 William Brereton, 3rd Baron Brereton (1631–1680), MP for Newton in 1659 and Bossiney 1660
 William Brereton (British Army officer) (1789–1864), colonel in the Royal Horse Artillery
 William Brereton (officer), British Army officer in South Carolina in 1782
 William Brereton (Norfolk cricketer) (1786–1851), English cricketer
 William Brereton (priest) (1726–1812), Archdeacon of Lichfield, 1782–1801
 William Brereton (planter) (died 1822), planter in British Guiana

See also
 Brereton (disambiguation)